Hazen is an unincorporated community and census-designated place in North Sewickley Township, Beaver County, Pennsylvania, United States. It sits on the southwestern side of Connoquenessing Creek, where Brush Creek flows into it. Via Connoquenessing Creek, Hazen is part of the Beaver River watershed flowing to the Ohio River.

References

Census-designated places in Beaver County, Pennsylvania
Unincorporated communities in Beaver County, Pennsylvania